Carey Mercer (born c. 1975) is a Canadian musician best known for his work as lead singer of the indie rock band Frog Eyes and his work in Swan Lake and Blackout Beach.

Overview
Following the breakup of the Canadian indie rock band Blue Pine in 2001, members Mercer and Michael Rak reunited to form a new group. Recruiting Mercer's roommate Spencer Krug and wife Melanie Campbell, the four began writing music under the moniker Frog Eyes.

Mercer also began writing music on the side for his solo project Blackout Beach, and in 2004, released the album Light Flows the Putrid Dawn through Soft Abuse Records. His follow-up, Skin of Evil was released January 27, 2009.  In November 2011, he released Fuck Death on Dead Oceans.  Mercer, his longtime drummer and wife Melanie Campbell, and Dante Decaro re-recorded these takes into the record Blues Trip, released digitally by the band and on vinyl by Soft Abuse Records on February 18, 2013.

In 2006, Mercer teamed up with comrades Spencer Krug (of Sunset Rubdown and Wolf Parade) and Dan Bejar (of Destroyer and The New Pornographers) to form the supergroup Swan Lake. The band released Beast Moans through Jagjaguwar Records on November 21, 2006. Enemy Mine, the second album from Swan Lake was released on March 24, 2009.

On March 25, 2020, Mercer announced he was forming a new band called Soft Plastics. He also announced the band's first LP, titled 5 Dreams, and released a single: "Rope off the Tigers."

Discography

Republic of Freedom Fighters
 Republic of Freedom Fighters LP (1996) Mountain Collective/Linkwork

Blue Pine
 Blue Pine LP (2001) Global Symphonic

Frog Eyes
 Emboldened Navigator EP (2003) Soft Abuse
 The Bloody Hand (2002) Global Symphonic
 The Golden River (2003) Animal World/Global Symphonic
 The Folded Palm (2004) Absolutely Kosher
 Ego Scriptor (2004) Absolutely Kosher
 The Future Is Inter-Disciplinary or Not at All (2006) Acuarela
 Tears of the Valedictorian (2007) Absolutely Kosher
 Paul's Tomb: A Triumph (2010) Dead Oceans
 Carey's Cold Spring (2013) self-released
 Pickpocket's Locket (2015) Paper Bag Records
  Violet Psalms (2018) Paper Bag Records

Blackout Beach
 Light Flows the Putrid Dawn (2004) Soft Abuse
 Skin of Evil (2009) Soft Abuse
 Fuck Death (2011) Dead Oceans
 11 Pink Helicopters in the Coral Sky (2012) Self-Released
 Blues Trip (2013) Soft Abuse

Soft Plastics
 5 Dreams (2020) Paper Bag Records

Swan Lake
 Beast Moans (2006) Jagjaguwar
 Enemy Mine (2009) Jagjaguwar

References

External links
 Official website: Frog Eyes
 Official website: Swan Lake
 Official website: Blackout Beach

1970s births
Living people
Musicians from Vancouver Island
Canadian rock singers
Canadian indie rock musicians
21st-century Canadian male singers